Election is a board game published in 1972 by Intellect Games.

Contents
Election is a game in which the board has ten regions and players move around the board to campaign in the regions.

Reception
Alan R. Moon reviewed Election for Games International magazine and stated that "I'd love to see someone take the time to fix this game, because it could be a great one. Right now, it's just a mess of potential."

Reviews
Games & Puzzles
Games & Puzzles 45

References

Board games introduced in 1972